Cisthene barnesii, or Barnes' lichen moth, is a moth of the family Erebidae. It was described by Harrison Gray Dyar Jr. in 1904. It is found in the US Rocky Mountain region, from southern Montana and western North Dakota to the border with Mexico in Arizona and New Mexico. The habitat consists of dry bunchgrass steppe.

The length of the forewings is 11–12 mm. The forewings are blackish gray with orange along the costal and posterior margins, connected by a narrow orange band across the distal third of the wing. The hindwings are red, dark pink or orange yellow with a narrow black marginal band. Adults have been recorded on wing from mid-July to late August.

Etymology
The species is named in honor of surgeon and entomologist William Barnes.

References

Cisthenina
Moths described in 1904